The Third Bruce ministry (Nationalist–Country Coalition) was the 18th ministry of the Government of Australia. It was led by the country's 8th Prime Minister, Stanley Bruce. The Third Bruce ministry succeeded the Second Bruce ministry, which dissolved on 29 November 1928 following the federal election that took place in November. The ministry was replaced by the Scullin ministry on 22 October 1929 following the federal election that took place on 12 October which saw Labor defeat the Coalition. That election also saw Bruce lose his own seat of Flinders; no sitting Prime Minister would lose his own seat again until 2007.

Aubrey Abbott, who died in 1975, was the last surviving member of the Third Bruce ministry. Stanley Bruce was the last surviving Nationalist minister.

Ministry

References

Ministries of George V
Bruce, 3
1928 establishments in Australia
1929 disestablishments in Australia
Cabinets established in 1928
Cabinets disestablished in 1929